The Otago Sparks is the women's representative cricket team for the New Zealand region of Otago and the surrounding area. They play their home games at University Oval, Dunedin. They compete in the Hallyburton Johnstone Shield one-day competition and the Women's Super Smash Twenty20 competition. They are the current holders of the Hallyburton Johnstone Shield, having won the 2021–22 competition.

History
Otago made their first appearance in the Hallyburton Johnstone Shield in 1939–40, where they lost to Wellington. The following period was dominated by Auckland and Wellington, however, and Otago did not record a second-place finish until 1957–58. They finished second again in 1960–61 before finally winning their first title in 1962–63, winning two matches and drawing one. In 1967–68, Otago competed in the Australian Women's Cricket Championships, finishing fourth out of five.

Otago did not play in major competition between 1983–84 and 1997–98. Some Otago players instead played for Southern Districts, which competed between 1983–84 and 1987–88. They returned for the 1998–99 season, but finished bottom of the one-day competition points table. 

Otago won their second one-day competition in 2013–14, finishing second in the group stage before beating Auckland in the final, helped by 99 from captain Suzie Bates and winning by 3 wickets off the penultimate delivery. They won their third one-day competition in 2021–22, finishing second in the group stage to qualify for the final, before beating group winners Wellington in the final by 138 runs.

Otago have also competed in the Twenty20 Super Smash since its inception in 2007–08, finishing second in 2014–15 before winning the title in 2016–17. They finished second in the group stage in 2016–17, but beat group winners Canterbury in the final, with Suzie Bates scoring 74 and Kate Heffernan taking 4/21. Otago bowler Leigh Kasperek was the leading wicket-taker in the tournament, with 8 wickets.

Grounds
Otago played their first home Hallyburton Johnstone Shield match at University Oval, Dunedin, and the ground has remained the side's primary home ground throughout their history. They also used Logan Park and Carisbrook, also in Dunedin, until the early 2000s.

From 2005, the side began using Molyneux Park, Alexandra and in 2007 Queens Park, Invercargill. In the 2017–18 season, they also began using Whitestone Contracting Stadium, Oamaru. In 2021–22, the side primarily used University Oval, as well as playing two games at Whitestone Contracting Stadium and three, for the first time, at Queenstown Events Centre. In 2022–23, the side used University Oval and Queenstown Events Centre for their home matches.

Players

Current squad
Based on squad announced for the 2022–23 season. Players in bold have international caps.

Notable players
Players who have played for Otago and played internationally are listed below, in order of first international appearance (given in brackets):

 Marge Bishop (1935)
 Merle Hollis (1935)
 Helen Allan (1935)
 Esther Blackie (1949)
 Eris Paton (1954)
 Betty Sinclair (1954)
 Mary Webb (1957)
 Daphne Robinson (1961)
 Trish McKelvey (1966)
 Louise Clough (1969)
 Carol Marett (1972)
 Jan Hall (1982)
 Gillian McConway (1982)
 Shona Gilchrist (1984)
 Catherine Campbell (1988)
 Clare Taylor (1988)
 Pauline te Beest (1990)
 Jill Saulbrey (1995)
 Rachel Pullar (1997)
 Paula Flannery (2000)
 Rowan Milburn (2000)
 Amanda Green (2003)
 Alex Blackwell (2003)
 Katey Martin (2003)
 Beth McNeill (2004)
 Suzie Bates (2006)
 Sarah Tsukigawa (2006)
 Lynsey Askew (2006)
 Laura Marsh (2006)
 Emma Campbell (2010)
 Morna Nielsen (2010)
 Kate Ebrahim (2010)
 Beth Langston (2013)
 Nicole Bolton (2014)
 Hayley Jensen (2014)
 Felicity Leydon-Davis (2014)
 Leigh Kasperek (2015)
 Amanda-Jade Wellington (2016)
 Kate Heffernan (2018)
 Alice Davidson-Richards (2018)
 Kirstie Gordon (2018)
 Linsey Smith (2018)
 Marina Lamplough (2019)
 Shebani Bhaskar (2019)
 Hannah Darlington (2021)
 Natasha Miles (2021)
 Eden Carson (2022)

Coaching staff

Head Coach: Craig Cumming

Honours
 Hallyburton Johnstone Shield:
 Winners (3): 1962–63, 2013–14, 2021–22
 Women's Super Smash:
 Winners (1): 2016–17

See also
 Otago cricket team

Notes

References

Women's cricket teams in New Zealand
Cricket in Otago
Super Smash (cricket)